Çermik is a town and district of Diyarbakır Province of Turkey. The population is 50,390 as of 2021. The mayor is Şehmus Karamehmetoğlu from the Justice and Development Party (AKP), and the current Kaymakam is Nazlı Demir.

Çermik got its name from its natural spa.  It was declared the Diyarbakir Thermal Tourism Center in October 1993.

History 
Within the Ottoman Empire, Cermik was within the Kurdish sanjaks of the Diyarbekir Eyelet. In 1925 the town came shortly under control of the rebels loyal to Sheikh Said. The Jewish population left the town in 1948 when Israel was founded.

Attractions 
The baths in the area draw many visitors and tourists from Turkey, mostly of neighboring provinces.

Main attractions are the Haburman Bridge, Çeteci Abdullah Pasha Madrasa, Ulu Cami (the Grand Mosque) the Bandeler Fountain (Bandeler Çesmesi) and the Gelincik Dağı ( Mountain of Gelincik) The town also counts with a Synagogue which dates back to the 1416, but it is not in use.

Notable people 

 Çeteci Abdullah Pasha, a former Vali of Diyarbakir.

References

 
Kurdish settlements in Turkey
Populated places in Diyarbakır Province
Towns in Turkey